Sword Of Justice is an American action-adventure television series that aired on NBC for one season during 1978 and 1979.

Synopsis

Dack Rambo starred as Jack Martin Cole, who had emerged from an unjust prison sentence to become a rich playboy by day and a troubleshooting mercenary at night, à la The Saint. Bert Rosario co-starred as Hector Ramirez, a former petty crook who was Cole's junior partner and former cell-mate, and Alex Courtney, another series regular, appeared as Arthur Woods, an attorney who had unsuccessfully defended Cole on criminal charges, who – from his involvement in that case – was motivated to head a special federal task force for the Justice Department to fight white-collar crime. His associate and partner in the task force was a federal agent known only by the family name of Buckner (Colby Chester).

Cole had previously been a full-time playboy, but his family had powerful enemies who framed him for embezzlement. Arthur Woods defended Cole at his trial, but without success. After being wrongly convicted, he served a prison sentence for the crimes he had not committed, à la The Rockford Files; Ramirez became his cell-mate during this period. During his confinement, Cole's parents died, and his family fortune was almost totally destroyed by their enemies. Bitter, hateful, and rage-filled as a direct result of his misfortunes, Cole swore revenge. To that end, once he returned to prison after attending his dead parents' funerals, he learned how to crack safes, break into banks, and most of the other secrets of the criminal trade. Upon his release, he decided to turn the tables on such above-the-law criminals as he blamed for his misfortunes by fighting them at their own game, à la It Takes a Thief, and using a unique way to leave his message: the "3" from a deck of cards, indicating how many years he spent behind bars. On these cards would be a written warning for the criminal(s).

The three of clubs would read: "The club is the sign of vengeance—it holds no man as friend." However, he would also leave clues for Woods to follow, not revealing his true identity. He would leave these with the three of diamonds. In the first installment of the series, "A Double Life," this card read: "A diamond's suit means, 'Fill your cup with wealth and worldly things.'" If there were persons Cole was assisting or protecting, he would leave the three of hearts with them. Presumably, the heart indicated compassion, concern, caring, and a wish not to see this person come to harm. The three of spades would mark the end of the game, and this card read: "The spade is the sword of justice—its rapier marks the end." In the pilot installment, later re-edited into the made-for-television film "A Double Life," the club was the sword; the spade, the vengeance sign. The second series installment, "Aloha, Julie Lang," reversed this.

The primary enemy Cole brought down in Sword Of Justice: "A Double Life" was played by Larry Hagman. Rambo and Hagman would later work together on Dallas.

Cast

Production
The series was produced by Glen A. Larson, who later incorporated the ideas of the choice of a lead best known for daytime television and of a lone crusader protecting helpless, powerless, and/or innocent people against white-collar, above-the-law criminals into Knight Rider.

Episodes

External links
 
 

1978 American television series debuts
1979 American television series endings
American action television series
1970s American drama television series
English-language television shows
NBC original programming
Television series by Universal Television
Television series created by Glen A. Larson
American action adventure television series
Television shows set in Chicago